Romarigães is a civil parish in the municipality of Paredes de Coura, Portugal. The population in 2011 was 246, in an area of 7.13 km².

Sites of interest
Casa Grande de Romarigães
Castro do Coto de Ouro

References

Freguesias of Paredes de Coura